Kendall Perkins Felder (September 25, 1915 - January 9, 1999) was an American professional baseball shortstop and second baseman in the Negro leagues. He played with the Chicago American Giants, Memphis Red Sox, and Birmingham Black Barons in 1945.

References

External links
 and Seamheads

Birmingham Black Barons players
Chicago American Giants players
Memphis Red Sox players
1915 births
1999 deaths
Baseball shortstops
Baseball second basemen
Baseball players from Texas
20th-century African-American sportspeople